The 1987 Women's Honda World Team Squash Championships were held in Auckland, New Zealand and took place from October 7 until October 14, 1987.

Seeds

Results

First round

Pool A

Pool B

Semi finals

Third Place Play Off

Final

References

See also 
World Team Squash Championships
World Squash Federation
World Open (squash)

World Squash Championships
Squash
W
Squash tournaments in New Zealand
1987 in women's squash
International sports competitions hosted by New Zealand
Women's World Team Squash Championships
1987 in New Zealand women's sport